The 2019 L'Alcúdia International Football Tournament is a football competition which is being held from 1 August to 8 August 2019 at Els Arcs de, Alcúdia.

Participating nations
All the five teams will play each other in a round robin phase and the top two teams will play the final.

Following national teams are participating :
 Bolivia U19 (CONMEBOL)
 Spain U19 (UEFA)
 (AFC)
 (CAF)
 Villarreal U20 (Spain)

Group stage
Times listed are UTC+02:00

Final

Top scorers

References

International association football competitions hosted by Spain
Women's international association football competitions
2019 in women's association football
2018–19 in Spanish football
August 2019 sports events in Spain